Jaromír Bünter (3 April 1930 in Ledvice – 15 October 2015 in Prague) was a Czech ice hockey player who competed in the 1956 Winter Olympics.

References

1930 births
2015 deaths
Czech ice hockey defencemen
Olympic ice hockey players of Czechoslovakia
Ice hockey players at the 1956 Winter Olympics
People from Teplice District
HC Sparta Praha players
Sportspeople from the Ústí nad Labem Region
Czechoslovak ice hockey defencemen